Butler Brothers was a retailer and wholesale supplier based in Chicago. It was founded in 1877 as a mail-order company by Charles Hamblet Butler, George H. Butler and Edward Burgess Butler.

History
In the 1920s, Butler Brothers moved into retailing with a chain of "Scott" and "L. C. Burr" stores. In the early 1930s, they developed the Ben Franklin Stores and Federated Stores, both of which were franchised five and dime stores. Most were in small towns. By 1936  there were 2,600 Ben Franklin stores and 1,400 Federated stores..

In the 1940s and 1950s, Butler Brothers was one of the largest wholesalers in the country. Unlike many modern franchises, which seek to present a uniform identity to consumers, the Ben Franklin franchise largely benefitted dime store owners by making weekly shipments from their warehouses, where tens of thousands of items were kept in inventory. Not only could a store owner order merchandise on Friday and receive it on Tuesday to replenish empty shelves, but by consolidating shipments, saved a considerable amount on freight, and found it easier to manage his inventory. 

Butler Brothers also organized special sale events every few weeks. Stores could order salebills with their own names on them, and in many cases, with sale prices they chose for the merchandise. Manufacturers would offer special prices to get the extra sales inherent by being included in such large promotions, which Butler Brothers would pass along to stores and consumers.

In the 1950s the company built 4 complete department stores in Greater Los Angeles: Lakewood Center (1952), Downtown Alhambra, Ontario, and Van Nuys.

In February 1960 the company was bought out by City Products Corp of Ohio, a company which had been in existence since 1894 as an ice company, for $53 million plus assumption of Butler Brothers liabilities.

See also

 Ben Franklin Stores
 Butler Brothers Company building, now known as Butler Square, in Minneapolis, Minnesota's warehouse district

References

External links
Ronald D. Michman, and Alan J. Greco; Retailing Triumphs and Blunders: Victims of Competition in the New Age of Marketing Management 
Sandra S. Vance and Roy V. Scott; Butler Brothers and the Rise and Decline of the Ben Franklin Stores: A Study in Franchise Retailing (1993)
 City Products

Economy of Minneapolis
Defunct companies based in Minnesota
Defunct companies based in Chicago
Companies based in Lake County, California
Companies based in Oregon
Companies based in California
Newberg, Oregon
Lakeport, California